Charles F. Armstrong (May 25, 1919 – March 9, 1965) was an American politician and lawyer in Illinois.

Biography
Armstrong was born in Statesville, North Carolina. He was an African American. Armstrong went to Tuskegee University and John Marshall Law School. He served in the United States Military during World War II. Armstrong served as assistant state's attorney for Cook County, Illinois. He lived in Chicago, Illinois with his wife and family and was involved with the Democratic Party. Armstrong served in the Illinois House of Representatives from 1957 until his death in 1965. Armstrong died suddenly from a heart attack at his home in Chicago after suffering from influenza.

Notes

1919 births
1965 deaths
People from Statesville, North Carolina
Military personnel from North Carolina
Lawyers from Chicago
Politicians from Chicago
John Marshall Law School (Chicago) alumni
Tuskegee University alumni
African-American state legislators in Illinois
Democratic Party members of the Illinois House of Representatives
20th-century American lawyers
20th-century African-American politicians
20th-century American politicians
American military personnel of World War II
African-American men in politics
African-American lawyers